"For a Swarm of Bees" is an Anglo-Saxon metrical charm that was intended for use in keeping honey bees from swarming. The text was discovered by John Mitchell Kemble in the 19th century. The charm is named for its opening words, "", meaning "against (or towards) a swarm of bees".

The word has been associated by Kemble, Jacob Grimm, and other scholars with the notion of valkyries (Old English ), and "shield maidens", hosts of female beings attested in Old Norse and, to a lesser extent, Old English sources, similar to or identical with the Idise of the Merseburg Incantations. Some scholars have theorized the compound to be a simple metaphor for the "victorious sword" (the stinging) of the bees.

In 1909, the scholar Felix Grendon recorded what he saw as similarities between the charm and the Lorsch Bee Blessing, a manuscript portion of the Lorsch Codex, from the monastery in Lorsch, Germany. Grendon suggested that the two could possibly have a common origin in pre-Christian Germanic culture.

Charm text 

Settle down, victory-women, sink to earth,
never be wild and fly to the woods.
Be as mindful of my welfare,
as is each man of border and of home.

Notes

References

Editions
 Foys, Martin et al. Old English Poetry in Facsimile Project (Center for the History of Print and Digital Culture, University of Wisconsin-Madison, 2019-); digital facsimile edition and Modern English translation

Sources

 
 
 
 
 
 

Anglo-Saxon metrical charms
Beekeeping
Occult texts